Worst Case, We Get Married is a 2017 French-Canadian drama film, directed by Léa Pool.

Nélisse stars as Aïcha, a teenage girl whose relationship with her mother Isabelle (Vanasse) has deteriorated since her parents broke up. While continuing to dream of leaving to live with her father, she meets Baz (Jean-Simon Leduc), an adult man for whom she starts to develop a romantic attraction.

It won the Vancouver International Film Festival's Women in Film and Television Artistic Merit Award. Vanasse received a Prix Iris nomination for Best Supporting Actress at the 20th Quebec Cinema Awards.

Cast 
 Sophie Nélisse : Aïcha Saint-Pierre
 Jean-Simon Leduc : Baz
 Karine Vanasse : Isabelle Saint-Pierre
 Isabelle Nélisse : Aïcha (enfant)
 Mehdi Djaadi : Hakim

References

External links 
 
 

Films directed by Léa Pool
Films based on Canadian novels
Canadian drama films
2017 films
2017 drama films
2010s French-language films
French-language Canadian films
2010s Canadian films